Little Singham is an Indian animated action television series produced by Rohit Shetty Picturez, in collaboration with Discovery Kids and Reliance Animation (a Reliance Entertainment Company). It premiered on 21 April 2018 on Discovery Kids, following the revamp of the channel. It showcases the life of Bajirao Singham as a little boy, who fights criminals, monsters, and dangerous mutants to save his city. It consists of 3 seasons and 254 episodes and several movies which are termed by Discovery Kids as "Blockbusters".

The show is based on the film Singham and all of its episodes are directed by Vikram Veturi. Reliance Entertainment commissioned Shekhar Veturi to create and develop the series, who also wrote the pilot episode and provided plot summaries in the first season. The show planned 156 episodes and 5 telefilms for the first season written by Sonam Shekhawat, Nidhi Anand, Angelene Kaur and Yash Thakur.

Characters

Main
 Little Singham: He is the main character in the show and the protector of Mirchi Nagar. Vijay and Black Shadow's son. He is also known as Ajay and Little Singham Bhai. He wears a khaki police uniform and black sunglasses. He saves the people from various threats in Mirchi Nagar & uses Panja Attack. When anyone shouts 'LITTLE SINGHAM!' (even a man falling from a hill) he becomes present there and saves them. His catchphrases are "Aata Majhi Satakli!" (English: I'm going crazy! or Now I have lost it!) and "Police ki Vardi sher ka dum, Naam hai mera - "Little Singham" (English: Police uniform and the strength of a lion, my name is Little Singham!). At the end of every episode, he says many Sher ki Shayari's of how he had saved the city from evil villains, and Hawaldar Karate often cheers at him and his vehicle is an inspector police jeep. 15 August is Little Singham's birthday. He has a lion tattoo on his upper arm which glows whenever someone is in trouble and there is a mess. When he is in his undercover identity as Ajay, he wears a school uniform and a white T-shirt. Some know he is Little Singham but most don't.
 Chikki: He is Little Singham's pet monkey. He also assists Little Singham. His favorite fruit is bananas. He wears a green shirt with a banana picture on it. His talks are not likely to have any meaning or just like a calling of monkey but everybody especially Little Singham understands what he says. Little Singham tells him to catch the criminal if the criminal is any minor one.
 Hawaldar Karate: He is the sergeant of Little Singham and Kavya's best friend. He likes to eat bhelpuri. His catchphrase is "Lathi Maar Ke" and "Bacha Le Re Little Singham!". He calls Little Singham 'Saheb' (Sir) and Kavya 'Kavya Madam'. 
 Inspector Kavya: A police inspector of Mirchi Nagar, along with Little Singham. Her best friend is Hawaldar Karate.
 Lattu: The self-announced assistant of Little Singham, a food lover, he loves to eat Dhokla and Khakhra. He wears a brown-red T-shirt and yellow shorts and has short black hair. He does not know that Ajay is Little Singham, but he is a fan of him. He is quite good As a student. He is weak in English. He loves his Nani (grandmother). He is not only a clumsy one but also Ajay's best friend.
  Babli: A brainy girl and is the daughter of Professor Avishkar. She is a very close friend of Little Singham or Ajay; moments of which are shown in many episodes.
 Professor Avishkar: The senior scientist of Faulad Singh & creates gadgets for Little Singham, Babli, Chikki & Lattu when problems are higher. His daughter is Babli.
  Mantriji (Prime Minister): is the prime minister of Mirchi Nagar and wears glasses, blue shoes, a light blue shirt, and pajamas. He has grey hair and often tells English words while speaking Hindi.

Supporting
 Rocky Cheetah: He is a half-human, half-cheetah villain who fights Little Singham. Before he became Rocky Cheetah, he was just a normal human named Rocky, but when he met Khatarnak Khatri, he made him evil and turned him into a half-human, half-cheetah villain. He is the first villain that Little Singham fights and he fought him in the Little Singham movie called Little Singham: Desh Ka Sipaahi. He was also training as a policeman alongside Ajay before he became a villain. He appeared in 5 movies, Little Singham: Desh Ka Sipaahi, Little Singham Super Squad, Super Squad: Ready Hai Hum, Super Squad: Jetenge Hum, Super Squad: Joshilay Janbaaz, Super Squad: Muskilon Ka Samna.
 Montu: A fat boy, a rival of Ajay, Lattu, and Babli.
 Khatarnak Khatri: Former Junior scientist of Faulad Singh & creates mutants to destroy Mirchi Nagar.
 Kallu and Ballu: The robbers of Mirchi Nagar and the most wanted criminals. They appear in many episodes and also appeared in two of the movies of Little Singham. In 2 movies, it is shown that they used to be a part of the police of England.
 King Cobra: He is a powerful villain of Mirchi Nagar. He attacks Indian Army. His catchphrase is "King Cobra Sabko Dhassega" and his fastest henchman is Sumudi Spy. They fight Little Singham.
 Teacher Tara: She is chemistry, mathematics, and reading teacher in Mirchi Nagar City High School. She wears a green saree and glasses.
 Commissioner Faulad Singh: A policeman who wears a turban. His senior scientist is Professor Avishkar & his junior scientist is Professor  Khatri and Takes Missions of Little Singham.
 Khatarnak Khatri: Former Junior scientist of Faulad Singh & creates mutants to destroy Mirchi Nagar.
 Montu: A fat boy, a rival of Ajay, Lattu, and Babli.
 Sumudi Spy: He is the fastest villain of King Cobra. His catchphrase is 'Sumudi Se gayab Ho Jaye Sumudi Spy'.
 Maha Mummy: is a mummy villain of Egypt. He always sings this song, which is "ooh la la la la ooh la la" and was a guard of skeletons and he fights Little Singham.
 Lallu Lafanga: is the number one villain of Mirchi Nagar. His catchphrase is "Mera Naam Lallu Lafanga Mere Se Nahi Lene Ka Panga". He wears a Blue Lungi, Dark Yellow Shirt, and Navy Blue Sunglasses.
 Junglee Joker: is a joker villain of Mirchi Nagar. His catchphrase is "Daraunga Main Aur Royenge Bachche" (English: "I will scare and the children may cry."). He appeared in the Little Singham movies, Little Singham Ke Rock and Roll Adventures and Little Singham: Future Mein Satakli.
  Lord Boga: is a villain of Mirchi Nagar his catchphrase is "Lord Boga Mirchi Nagar Ka Raja Hoga Paisa Paisa Paisa" he steals money and jewellery. He has two guards, Kallu and Ballu and he wears purple pajamas and a brown belt and he also fights Little Singham.
 Shambala: is a villain of Mirchi Nagar. He has a wand with a green diamond. 
 Dhaturaja: is a metal-eating villain of Mirchi Nagar. His catchphrase is "Dhatu Khaunga Sabki Band Bajaunga Tring Tring". He fights Little Singham.
 Chef Chao Chao Khao Khao: is a Chinese chef villain of Mirchi Nagar. He makes Chowmein and fights Little Singham.
 Kaal Rakshas: is a powerful villain of Mirchi Nagar. His catchphrase is "Jaag Utha Hai  Kaal, Ab Prithvi Banegi Pataal, Tabahi, Tabahi, Tabahi". He has a bat named Senapati Khokaar and he appeared in six Little Singham movies, Little Singham Aur Kaal Ka Mahajaal, Kaal Ki Tabaahi, Kaal Ka Badla, Kaal Ki Shatir Chaal, Kans Aur Kaal Ka Raaj, Return of Little Singham, and Kaal Bana Vishkaal. He also appeared in the Little Singham miniseries, Paap Aur Punya Ka Mahasangram. In those six movies and in that miniseries, he fought Little Singham. He has 3 bodyguards named Krodha, Lobina, and Shambala. He changes into another form called Maha Kaal. He also changes into Kaal Rakshak.
  Munna Mucchi: is a villain of Mirchi Nagar. His catchphrase is "Mera Naam Hai Munna Mucchi Mai Se karunga Kucchi Kucchi, Mucchi Pe Lagaya Tel, Ab Dekhna Khel'!'". He wears a red shirt and White Lungi. He steals jewelry and he lives in a coconut factory.
 Ulti Palti: She is a magician villain of Mirchi Nagar. She makes magic and attacks Mirchi Nagar and fights Little Singham.
 Daaku Dhamaka: is a kidnapping villain of Mirchi Nagar. His catchphrase is "Bandook Baja Ke". In the episode called "Fake Mantriji", he kidnapped Mantriji (Prime Minister). He has two guards, Kallu and Ballu.
 Barood: is a powerful villain of Little Singham and his catchphrase is "Barood Ka Dhamaka". He uses grenades and he also has guards. 
 Dugabakka: is a very powerful ghost monster and he has a monster group and appears in the Little Singham movie called Little Singham: Legend of Dugabakka, Shaitaan Ka Toofan. He also appeared in the Little Singham mini series called "Paap Aur Punya Ka Mahasangram". He also wanted to take the Punya Astra. He was released by Kaal Rakshas. He also kidnapped Vijayveer's parents.
 Lord Santri: A villain of Tirchi Nagar who is the opposite version of Mantriji. He first appears in the episode called "Ulta Pulta" and wears the same clothes as Lord Boga.
 Minister Boga: The prime minister of Tirchi Nagar, the opposite universe of Mirchi Nagar that first appears in the episode called "Ulta Pulta". He is the opposite version of Lord Boga. He first appears in the episode called "Ulta Pulta" and wears the same clothes as Mantriji.
 Yam Yam Yappan: He lives in a forest and captures animals in Kerala. His catchphrase is "Mera Naam hai Yam Yam Yappan Ek do teen chaar paanch che so chhappan". He appeared in 4 episodes and also appeared in later episodes of this show as well.
 Maha Shark: He is a shark villain created by Khatarnak Khatri. He fought Little Singham in 3 episodes. He has 2 bodyguards named Sachi & Muchi and they all (Maha Shark, Sachi, and Muchi) fight Little Singham and his catchphrases are "Sabko Kaatega Maha Shark".
 Serpina: She is a snake villain created by Shambhala. She fought Little Singham in 4 episodes and 1 movie, which was King Cobra Sabko Dhassega. She hypnotizes Mirchi Nagar. She has a catchphrase, which is "kardoon mushkil jeena naam hai Serpina". She fights Little Singham. And she also appeared in the Little Singham miniseries named Paap aur Punya Ka Mahasangram: New Friends. She was released from Kaal Rakshas.
 Bhuchaal: He is the international criminal created by King Cobra. He fights Little Singham in 2 episodes and 1 movie "Cobra Sabko Dhassega". His catchphrase is "Bhu Bhu Bhuchaal Bhuchaal Machaye Hahakaar".
 Shaitan Sher: Shaitan Sher is the dangerous lion villain created by Khatarnak Khatri and Shambala. He fights Little Singham in 3 episodes. Shaitan Sher defeated Rakshak Sher in Gujarat.
 Chidibaaz: He is the bird civilian of Mirchi Nagar. He controls birds. His catchphrase is "Gutter Goo Gutter Goo". He fought Little Singham in 3 episodes. He lives in Chidi Mahal. He likes to steal jewellery.
 Jumbo Joker: He is a villain who is the future version of Junglee Joker. He first appeared in the Little Singham movie called "Little Singham Future Mein Satakli".
 Rowdy Rhino: A villain of Mirchi Nagar that is a rhino. His catchphrase is "Rowdy Hoon Main Rowdy". He was one of the mutants created by Khatarnak Khatri.
Bull Dozer: A villain of Mirchi Nagar that is a bull. He was one of the strongest mutants created by Khatarnak Khatri.
Magar Mosa: He is a crocodile friend of Little Singham. His Catchphrase is "Magar Mosa Ko Aayega Gussa". He has 2 bodyguards named Haddi and Pasli. They all (Magar Mosa, Haddi, and Pasli) fight Little Singham. He first appeared in the Little Singham movie called "Little Singham Bandarpur Mein Hu...Ha...Hu". In that movie, he was a villain who later became a friend to Little Singham in that movie.
Fulka: She is a villain that came to destroy the Statue of Harmony in MirchiNagar. She has 6 soldiers and they all fight Little Singham.
Johnny: He is the yoga thief. He fights Little Singham and steals Koohinoor Diamonds. He also fights the Indian Police. He was thrown in jail by Little Singham. He fought Little Singham in 1 episode and 1 movie called Little Singham Chala London.
Mr.X: He is the presidential villain of India. He fought Little Singham and Black Shadow in the Little Singham movies called Little Singham Ki Black Shadow Se takkar and Mission International Secret Plane Ki Khoj, Mission International Secret Plane Ki Khoj 2, and Mission International: New Frontiers. He was the one that kidnapped Commissioner Faulad Singh. He wears powerful hand gloves. He has a bodyguard named Agent Wire, whose catchphrase is "Left, Right, Rakshaka Guide".
Rubina:She is a enemy of Little Singham, Black Shadow, and Vijay. She also had a plan to destroy Indian countries which could start World Wars. III. She also had a catchphrase called "You are too good". She was also Vijay's friend before she became a villain. She was also a friend of Mr.X (who she calls Max), Yantram (who she calls Yash) in past times. She became a robot in the R.E.D. Microchip episode and also inserted a brain chip into a R.E.D. transformer in that episode.
Anghar: He is the fiery henchman of Shivaji. He fights Little Singham, Shivaji, and Commissioner Faulad Singh. He appeared in the episode called "Happy Tamil New Year". He also appeared in the Little Singham movies, Super Squad: Joshilay Janbaaz, Super Squad: Muskilon Ka Samna.
 Hawaldar Karate: He is the sergeant of Little Singham and Kavya's best friend. He likes to eat bhelpuri. His catchphrase is "Latthi Maarke". When he says this and plays with his stick that becomes out of control, Kavya becomes angry at him. He calls Little Singham 'Saheb' (Sir) and Kavya 'Kavya Madam'. He and Kavya appear as robbers in the episode called "Ulta Pulta".
Admiral Rathore: is a captain of Mirchi Nagar he was a duty in Indian Navy he wears a white shirt, White Caps, etc. He also once saved someone on a mission.
Major Krishnan: is an army captain of Mirchi Nagar his duty is in Indian Army. He was attacked by King Cobra and Little Singham takes upon his duty. He wears army shirts and red caps.
Wing Commander Karan Singh: He is a wing Commander of Mirchi Nagar. His duty is in Indian Air Force, he wears Blue shirts and blue caps.
Shanta Nani: A chef of Mirchi Nagar. She lives in Ahmedabad, Gujarat. He makes Khakhra and Dhokla and her grandson is Lattu.
Koyal Didi: is a singer of Mirchi Nagar. She is a very good singer and her sister, Kuku, is a sitar player.
Buddhi Man: is a brainy villain of Mirchi Nagar. His catchphrase is "Buddhi Man bahat hi best hai". He has a robot donkey named Calculator and they fight Little Singham.
 Misti Aunty: is a noisy lady of Mirchi Nagar. When she needs help, she calls Little Singham. She wears a green blouse and a red saree.
Komal: is the daughter of Mantriji. She is a fan of Little Singham and she knows all names like Lattu and Babli.
Barood: is a powerful enemy of Little Singham and his catchphrase is "Barood Ka Dhamaka". He uses Grenades To destroy India and he also has guards. He fights Little Singham.
Chappan Churi: She is the chor rani villain. She likes Rowdy Rhino. She fights Little Singham. Her catchphrases are "Thikhi Pasand Hai Mujhe Pani Puri Choron Ki Rani Main Chappan Churi". She lives in a place that was shown in the episode called "Little Singham Vs Chappan Churi". She also first appeared in that episode.
Side Effect: He is the villain who Little Singham fought in the episode called "Little Singham Vs Side Effect". He was defeated by Little Singham with his new style. Bichu Biker gang also joined Side Effect.
Doctor Virus: He is a virus enemy of Little Singham. His Catchphrase is "Very Very Virus". He appeared in the Little Singham movie called Little Singham: Desh Ka Sipaahi Mission Josh and in the episode called "Zukhamo Virus Attack" and "Zombie train". He fights Little Singham.
Rahashya: She is a half-human, half-camel enemy of Little Singham. She appeared in the Little Singham movie called Fantasy Land: Lost in adventure, Little Singham Aur Pyramids Ka Rahashya. She fought Little Singham in that movie.
Raja Kako: He is an ancient villain. He also appeared in the Little Singham movie called Fantasy Land: Lost in adventure, Little Singham aur pyramids ka rahashya. He was defeated by Little Singham. He kidnapped Raja Chako. He has a bodyguard named Seven-toothed tiger.
Gutter Ganjoo: A enemy of Little Singham that is a rat. His catchphrase is "Gat Gat Gatariya Jamke khaunga muscles banaunga". He was one of the intelligent mutants created by Khatarnak Khatri.
 Hanikarak Hippo: A hippo villain created by Khatarnak Khatri. He first appeared in the episode called "Little Singham V/s Hanikarak Hippo".
Sanya Jeko: He is a villain who lives in Spain. He first appears in the episode called "Maushi in Spain". His catchphrase is "Sanya Jeko Maaf Nahi Sabko Saaf Kar deta hai". He fights Little Singham. He kidnapped Maushi.
 General Tank: He is a powerful villain of Mirchi Nagar. His catchphrase is "Tank machaye Aatank". He attacked India in the Little Singham movie called Little Singham Super Squad. He teams up with King Cobra in the episode called General Tank ki secret Submarine. He also has some guards and one of his guards is named Aajgar and he fights Little Singham.
Aag Bagula: He is a dragon enemy of Little Singham. He appeared in the Little Singham movie called Little Singham in Fantasy Land. His catchphrase is Naam hai mera Aag Bagula. He was defeated by Little Singham and Draquor. He has a bodyguard named Shole. He lives in Dragon Land.
Haivaan: He is an Aqua enemy of Little Singham and has a catchphrase, which is "Samundar se layega toofan Haivaan". He fought Little Singham and Krishna in the episode called Little Singham Aur Krishna in Haiwan Ka toofan and he also fought a princess mermaid named Laharikhand in that episode. He also appeared in 2 Little Singham movies, Little Singham: Samundar Ka Sikandar and Return of Samundar Ka Sikandar. He also has a bodyguard named Jalgohra. 
Bhadiya: He is Chinu's and Wolfman's enemy in the Little Singham movie called Super Squad Ready Hai Hum. He collabed with Janwar in that movie and has a wolf army that kidnaps kids. He fought the Super Squad in that movie and he can form a pet poison flower.
Tanashah: He is the oldest villain of Commissioner Faulad Singh. His 4 killer squad are enemies of Little Singham. He also first appeared in the Little Singham movie, Super Squad Ready Hai Hum. He also appeared in the Little Singham movie, Super Squad: Muskilon Ka Samna.
Kans: Kans, also known as Kans Mama, is an enemy of Krishna and Little Singham. He Collabed with Kaal Rakshas and fought Little Singham in the episode "Kans Aur Kaal ka raaj" on Independence Day. He first appeared in the Little Singham movie, Little Singham Aur Krishna: Jodi No.1. He also appeared in Little Singham Aur Krishna: Jodi Mein Dum. He is also a powerful deity. Kans and Mahakaal were defeated by Little Singham and Little Krishna in the Little Singham movie called Return of Little Singham.
Janwar: Janwar is a powerful enemy of Little Singham, Veer, Shivaji, etc. He was a powerful version of Rocky Cheetah. His Catchphrases are"Janwar hoon Main Janwar" He kidnapped Commissioner Faulad Singh in the Little Singham movie, Little Singham Super Squad. He also appeared in 4 other Little Singham movies, Super Squad: Ready Hai Hum, Super Squad: Jeetenge Hum, Super Squad: Muskillion ka Samna, Super Squad: Joshilay Janbaaz.
Mahishasur: Mahishasur is a buffalo asura enemy of Little Singham, Shakti, Little Ganesh, and Little Hanuman. With his Maha-Astra, the weapon of ultimate destruction can annihilate the world. He has 2 asura guards, Kallu asura and Ballu asura. He was created by Shambala in an ancient crown.  He also first appeared in the blockbuster called "Bahubali friends: The rise of Mahishasur" and "Paap aur Punya ka mahasangram: The journey".
Yantram: He is a robot crab villain of Venice. He collabed with King Cobra, Tanashah, and Barood in the Little Singham movie, Little Singham: Black Shadow. He fought Little Singham and Black Shadow (Little Singham's mother) in that movie. He can also produce destruction in Venice. He also appeared in the Little Singham movies called Little Singham Aur Black Shadow: Mission International and Little Singham: Ultimate Soldier. His catchphrase is "Vinash Mera mantra naam Mera yantram". He also helped Rubina to put that R.E.D. microchip in her robot.
Falcon: Falcon, also known as Fake Falcon, is the flying villain of Mirchi Nagar and steals golden face masks in Mexico. Little Singham takes training to defeat the falcon. He also has superhero guards named Red, Blue, Purple, and Green. He appeared in the Little Singham movie called Little Singham aur Black Shadow: Mission International. He fought with Carlos in that movie. He also has an eagle symbol under his shirt.
Jabar Daluga:He is the magic enemy of both Krishna and Little Singham. With the help of this magic hat, he defeated so many villains. He wants to take spam kadha to produce destruction. He captured a palace. His catchphrase "Gili Guru shah karein apne dusmano koin tabaah". He was defeated by Little Singham with the help of an intelligent brain.
Lobina:She was a bodyguard of Kall Rakshaks many years ago. She attacked swarna deep lok and kidnapps Raja Suryadev. She wanted to take tyag punya astra. She also made spider soldiers. She appeared in the Little Singham miniseries, "Paap aur Punya Ka Mahasangram: Lost Worlds". She also helped Shambala to release Kaal Rakshas. She dragged Little Singham's lion tattoo. She was defeated by Little Singham and Krishna. She has a catchphrase called "Ooh la la laalach".
Shankar: He is the dangerous octopus villain. He is a bad version of Haivaan. He rules Dwarka and makes soldiers. He appeared in the Little Singham miniseries, "Paap A Punya Ka Mahasangram: Final Battle". He also wanted to take aatma Vishwas astra. He also got defeated by Little Singham and Krishna.
Ghamandi Ghoda: He is the Ghoda Rakshas. He appeared in the Little Singham miniseries, "Paap Aur Punya Ka Mahasangram: The Journey". He also wanted punya astra and took ekta chakra. He also kidnapped Ashwalaksh, Ashwatej, and Ashwabal. He was defeated by Little Singham and Krishna.

Other
Kutty: He is the elephant friend of Little Singham and Chikki. He doesn't talk. Instead, Little Singham understands whatever he says. He can also fly in the sky.
Tashan Mama: He is a stylish human. He lives in Kishangarh. He has so many talents. He wears a Green dress, Red bunny, Red topi, dancing shoes, and types of sunglasses. He doesn't like tension (as seen in the Little Singham movie called Kaal Ka Badla). Kavya, Hawaldar Karate & Chikki meet him in Tasanagar.
Black Shadow: She is the mother of Little Singham and a brave undercover agent who even sacrificed her family and son, Little Singham for the sake of the welfare of India. Also known as Akira. She appeared for the first time in the Little Singham movie called "Little Singham Ki Black Shadow Se Takkar", which is also the Mother's Day special. She also has the strength of a lioness. She also appeared in the new blockbusters called "Little Singham Aur Black Shadow: Mission International", "Mission International Secret Plane Ki Khoj", "Mission International Secret Plane Ki Khoj 2", and "Mission International: New Frontiers".
Vijay: He is the father of Little Singham. He is also a scientist and is also good at helping India. He also invented R.E.D technology with a goal to prevent the lives of soldiers from being lost, but Vijay's teammate friends: Mr.X, Yantram, Rubina snatched his invention and tried to misuse it trigger and create World War III to destroy India but failed after being defeated by Little Singham, Black Shadow, and Vijay. He also built an ultimate soldier machine which make battling impossible. He also appreared in the new Little Singham movie Little Singham: Ultimate Soldier and Ultimate Soldier Cyborgs Ka Tehelka which welcomed him as a home. He first appeared in the Little Singham movie called "Little Singham Ki Black Shadow Se Takkar".
Naughty Ghost: He is the court rakshak ghost. He saved Kavya and his catchphrase is "Chappu". He appeared in the episode called "Little Singham Vs Naughty Ghost".
Kalari Yodha: She is a Warrior in Kerala. Her enemies are Kaal Rakshas and Yama Yama Yappan. She was a Kalari teacher and Little Singham learned Kalari for defeating Yama Yama Yappan. Kalari Yodha is also a part of Sher dil Rakshak. She has Joined Rethpurush, Rakshak Sher, Shervanshi.
Raja Chako: He is a man who lives in Peru. He first appears in the Little Singham movie called Little Singham in Fantasy Land. He was kidnapped by Raja Kako in the Little Singham movie called Fantasy Land: Lost in adventure.
Detective Danny: He is a police detective of England and he catches Little Singham and failed in the Little Singham movie called Little Singham Chala London and he caught Lord Boga when he was stealing the Cricket World Cup Trophy in the Little Singham movie called Little Singham De Dhana Dhan World Cup. He has 2 hawaldars and was duplicated by Kallu and Ballu once.
Laharikha: She is a mermaid and friend of Little Singham. Her catchphrase is "wooos". She was the daughter of Raja Sagadeer. Her enemy is Haivaan. She is also Lattu's crush. 
Bruno and Rags: Bruno and Rags are the first and second army dogs of Major Krishnan. They both have a sense of smell and they both have the ability to fight with King Cobra, General Tank, and Barood. They both are Little Singham's friends and appeared in 2 Little Singham movies called "Little Singham Desh Ka Sipaahi: Mission Dog Squad" and "Desh Ka Sipaahi: Mission Dog Squad Dobaara". They first appeared in the Little Singham movie called "Little Singham: Super Squad".
Shourya: He is the third army dog of Major Krishnan. He failed at training and also can't jump. He saved Little Singham, Bruno and Rags. He also has a sense of smell and defeated king cobra and general tank. He first appeared in the Little Singham movie called "Desh Ka Sipaahi: Mission Dog Squad dobaara".
Pushpak: He is the wing commander of Indian Air Force. He got attacked by General Tank and also took on some missions of Little Singham in the episode called "Evil droid ka hamala".
Chinnu: She is a forest and animal super squad of little Singham. She controls plants and animals. Bhadiya, Janwar, and Tanashah is the enemy of the super squad.
Shivaji: He is the super squad from Chennai. He is a super squad friend of little Singham. He has a ice power that fights Bhadiya, Janwar, Tanashah and Anghar. His villain is Bhadiya, Janwar, Tanashah and Anghar.
Veer: He is big and is the first super squad member. He is a Bulk super Squad from Punjab. He puffs in size from small to big and fights with Bhadiya, Janwar, and Tanashah. Professor Kamaal met him at the same time.
Shakti: She is the first bahubali friend of Little Singham. She has 4 hands. She first appeared in "Little Singham ke bahubali friends 2". He also appeared in "Bahubali friends:  Rise of Mahishasur and "Bahubali Friends vs Halaaku. She has 3 villains, Ghota, Mahishasur,Halaaku.
Little Hanuman: He is the second bahubali friend of Little Singham. He has a Gada (mace) that defeats zombies, asteroids, and mahishasur. He also appeared in 4 blockbusters called "Little Singham ke bahubali friends", "Little Singham ke bahubali friends 2", "Bauhbali friends: The rise of Mahishasur", "Jai Ho Little hanuman", Bahubali Friends vs Halaaku. He has 2 villains Daraku and Mahishasur.
Little Ganesh: He is the last Bahubali Friend of Little Singham. He has a golden ax, elephant-like nose, and trunk. His 2 villains are Kogasura and Mahishasur. He also appeared in 3 blockbusters called "Little Singham Ke Bahubali Friends", "Little Singham Ke Bahubali Friends 2", "Bahubali Friends: Rise of Mahishasur", and "Bahubali Friends vs Halaaku".
 Carlos: Carlos, also known as Mexico Karate, is a different version of Karate. His lathe is different than karate's lathe. He can throw a stick and catch it. He has a enemy called Falcon. His Mexico police uniform is different from Karate's police uniform. His catchphrase is "lathi ki chakram tipu ta nu like a boss".
Krishna:He was the major deity in Hinduism. he appears as a kid in the Little Singham movies called "Little Singham aur Krishna Jodi Mein Hai Dum", "Little Singham Aur Krishna: Jodi No.1", "Return of Little Singham" and "Little Singham Ke Bahubali Friends". He has defeated mahakaal and mahabali kans in "Return of Little Singham".He defeated all of the kans' monsters and mahabali kans too. He is also a friend of lattu, Babli, chikki, and Ajay. He also restored the world back to normal with the help of Sher Dil Jwala.
Vishwakal:He is a human toy. He collabed with Little Singham and fools Janwar and fake failed Singh. With the help of Little Singham, he fools Janwar and fakes Faulad Singh as a real computer chip. He did wrong and right things. Without the help of nuclear missiles, he would never destroy India. He pulls Janwar's power and returns the power back to the Super Squad.

Voice actors
 Ajay / Little Singham  – Sumrridhi Shukla
Krishna — Prachi Save Saathi
 Komal - Nilufer Middey Khan
 Lattu – Jigna Bharadhwaj
 Rocky / Rocky Cheetah - Rajesh Shukla
 Teacher Tara - Jigna Bharadhwaj
 Inspector Kavya – Neshma Chemburkar
  Babli - Sonal Kaushal
 Hawaldar Karate – Ganesh Divekar
 Carlos (or) Mexico Karate - Ganesh Divekar
 Kallu – Ganesh Divekar
 Lord Boga – Ganesh  Divekar
 Mantriji – Anamaya Verma
 Lord Santri – Anamaya Verma
 Junglee Joker – Anamaya Verma
 Shambhala – Parminder Ghumman
 Khatarnaak Khatri – Anamaya Verma
 Professor Avishkar – Saumya Daan
 Chikki - Saumya Daan
 Ballu - Saumya Daan
 Ganesha / Veenu Nayak - Meghna Erande
 Hanuman - Nilufer Middey Khan
 Hanikarak Hippo - Adityaraj Sharma SR.

Broadcast 
The series originally launched on April 21, 2018, on Discovery Kids. On December 24, 2022, the series also started broadcasting on Discovery Kids' new sister channel Pogo TV.

References

External links 

 Little Singham on IMDb

2018 Indian television series debuts
Indian children's animated action television series
Discovery Kids (Indian TV channel) original programming
Indian television shows based on films
Cop Universe
Indian television spin-offs